Saúl Berjón Pérez (born 24 May 1986) is a Spanish professional footballer who plays as a left winger or forward.

Club career
Born in Oviedo, Asturias, Berjón  graduated from Real Oviedo's youth setup, but started playing as a senior with lowly Berrón CF. After representing CD Lealtad and UP Langreo also in the Tercera División, he signed with Segunda División B club UD Pájara Playas de Jandía in summer 2007.

Berjón scored nine goals during the season, and subsequently moved to UD Las Palmas of Segunda División on 19 May 2008. He played his first match as a professional on 30 August, coming on as a substitute for Sergio Suárez in the 56th minute of a 1–0 away loss against Real Sociedad.

Berjón scored his first professional goal on 13 September 2008, in a 2–2 home draw with Real Zaragoza. He added four more during his debut campaign with the Canary Islands side.

On 19 August 2010, Berjón joined FC Barcelona for a €300,000 fee, being assigned to the reserves also in the second division. He appeared regularly for the Catalans, before being loaned to AD Alcorcón in the same league on 30 August 2011.

On 4 August 2012, Berjón signed for Real Murcia. After narrowly avoiding relegation in 2012–13 he featured in 43 matches the following season, again scoring six times and providing a league-best 20 assists as the Pimentoneros finished fourth but were relegated due to financial problems.

On 26 August 2014, Berjón agreed to a two-year deal at SD Eibar, newly promoted to La Liga. He made his debut in the competition four days later, replacing Dani García in a 2–1 defeat at Atlético Madrid. He scored his first league goal on 4 September, through a spectacular volley in a 3–3 home draw against Levante UD.

Berjón moved abroad for the first time in his career on 24 June 2016, signing for Mexico's Club Universidad Nacional. On 28 December, he returned to Spain and its second division after joining his first club Oviedo.

On 15 September 2020, the 34-year-old Berjón signed for third-tier Burgos CF. They were promoted at the end of his first season, but he left on 9 January 2023 after falling down the pecking order.

Personal life
Berjón's cousin, Adrián Colunga, was also a footballer. A striker, he played for several clubs during his career.

Career statistics

Club

References

External links

1986 births
Living people
Spanish footballers
Footballers from Oviedo
Association football forwards
La Liga players
Segunda División players
Segunda División B players
Tercera División players
CD Lealtad players
UP Langreo footballers
UD Las Palmas players
FC Barcelona Atlètic players
AD Alcorcón footballers
Real Murcia players
SD Eibar footballers
Real Oviedo players
Burgos CF footballers
Liga MX players
Club Universidad Nacional footballers
Spanish expatriate footballers
Expatriate footballers in Mexico
Spanish expatriate sportspeople in Mexico